Ramshah Tomar (born Ramsingh Tomar) was the last Tomara Rajput king of Gwalior. Owing to his valour, Udai Singh  married one of his daughter to Ramshah's son Shalivahan Singh Tomar.

After being defeated by Akbar in Gwalior, he continued offering resistance to mughals from his maternal home Mewar and later on died fighting in the Battle of Haldighati.

Abd al-Qadir Badayuni, a Mughal historian who fought against Ramshah in the Battle of Haldighati praised him in his book as follows -

"I saw a warrior who left the battle of the elephants on the right, reached the main part of the Mughal army and carried out terrifying manslaughter there. Ramshah, the grandson of the famous Raja Man Singh of Gwalior, who always remained in Rana's Haraval (front row), showed such valor which is beyond the power of writing. Due to his powerful attack, the Rajputs of Mansingh kachwaha on the left side of Haraval had to flee and take shelter of the Sayyids of the right side, which also caused Asaf Khan to flee. If the Sayyid people had not kept fighting at that time, then the runaway army of the Haraval (front row) had created such a situation that we would have faced a shameful defeat."

Abul fazl, the grand Vizier of Akbar, wrote in his Akbarnama -

"These two (Ramshah & Shalivahan) were friends of war and enemies of life, who had made life cheap and honour expensive. Battling with valour, Ramshah, his three sons - Shalivahan Singh, Bhavani Singh, Pratap Singh, his grandson - Balbahadur and 300 of his Tomar followers were all martyred. Not a single brave man of the Tanwar clan survived the war."

Owing to their Valour and devotion, Two Chhatris (Memorials) were made by Maharana Karan Singh (grandson of Maharana Pratap) in Rakt Talai for Ramshah Tomar and Shalivahan Singh Tomar.

Lineage & Descendants 
Tomar Descendants of Sohan Singh s/o  Anangpal , the ruler of Delhi in the 12th century.
 Virsingh nearly A.D.1375
 Uddhharandev    A.D.1400
 Vikramdev
 Ganapatidev     A.D.1419
 Dugarendrasingh
 Kalyanmalla
 Man Singh Tomar  A.D.1486
 Vikramaditya Tomar 
 Ramshah Tomar 
 Shalivahan Singh Tomar (married a daughter of Udai Singh  of Mewar)
 Shyamshah Tomar
 Mitrasen Tomar
 Rao Dharmagat
 Bhawani Singh Tomar
 Pratap Singh Tomar

Later on, his descendants ruled from the Thikanas in Lakhansar (Bikaner), Khetasar and Kelawa (Jodhpur) and Dalniya (Jaipur).

References 

People from Gwalior